The Nigerian Peoples Party (NPP) was one of the major political parties that contested elections in the Nigerian Second Republic. The party was made up of three major groups: the Lagos Progressives, Club 19, and the Nigerian Council of Understanding. The Lagos progressives included some Lagos based NCNC politicians such as Adeniran Ogunsanya, T.O.S. Benson and Kola Balogun. The National Council of understanding was led by Waziri while Club 19 had Matthew Mbu, Solomon Lar, Omo Omoruyi, Paul Unongo, Antonio Fernandez and others as members.

Though the party was formed to create a national outlook, the exit of Waziri Ibrahim, led to an erosion of politics without borders. Waziri's exit was precipitated because he wanted to be the chairman and also the presidential candidate of the party. The party later came to be seen as an eastern Nigerian party, though it hard scores of support in Plateau State, Rivers State and Lagos. The party tried to promote social justice and social change as vital ingredients of its mission. In 1979, the party chose former president Nnamdi Azikiwe as its presidential candidate.

In states like Imo State, leaders such as the governor, Sam Mbakwe were elected with landslide victories (over 80%) in the Imo State Legislative, Gubernatorial and Presidential Elections in Nigeria in 1979. In Imo State, the NPP Campaign Director, Party Secretary and principal architect in electing Sam Mbakwe, was Dr. Sebastian Okechukwu Mezu.

Before the 1979 elections, the party took some political hits, about 254 of its candidates were disqualified from contesting electoral seats, the second most out of the five major parties. Nevertheless, the party won about 17% of the House of Representative seats and three gubernatorial elections.

Second Republic
During the Second Republic, the National Party of Nigeria's (NPN) weak hold on the House of Assembly led to an alliance between the NPP and the NPN. The NPP submitted a few candidates for ministerial appointments to consummate the alliance. NPP personalities such as Ishaya Audu, a vice presidential candidate of the party, were selected as ministers. However, the accord hit the rocks in 1981, and Adeniran Ogunsanya, the chairman of the party, asked all ministers to resign; many did not heed his call and some transferred to the NPN.

References
Ergun Ozbudun, Myron Weiner; Competitive Elections in Developing Countries, Duke University Press, 1987

Defunct political parties in Nigeria